Clark Gable (1901–1960) was an American actor and producer who appeared in over 70 feature films and several short films. Gable first began acting in stage productions, before his film debut in 1924. After many minor roles, Gable landed a leading role in 1931, subsequently becoming one of the most dominant leading men in Hollywood. He often acted alongside re-occurring leading ladies: six films with Jean Harlow, seven with Myrna Loy, and eight with Joan Crawford, among many others.

Gable's first role opposite Joan Crawford was in Dance, Fools, Dance (1931), the first of eight films in which they appeared together. He was billed sixth. That same year, he also appeared in the gangster film The Secret Six, his first film with Harlow. In 1932, he acted alongside future wife Carole Lombard in No Man of Her Own. In his next role in Dancing Lady (1933), Gable appeared alongside Ted Healy and His Stooges and Fred Astaire, who was making his acting debut. Gable's role in the Frank Capra-directed It Happened One Night (1934) garnered him the Academy Award for Best Actor.

For his performance in Mutiny on the Bounty (1935), Gable was nominated for the Academy Award for Best Actor. He then appeared in San Francisco, which was the highest-grossing film of 1936. In 1937, he starred in Saratoga; his co-star Jean Harlow died during production. Gable then appeared in Too Hot to Handle (1938), the last of seven films with Myrna Loy. He then played Rhett Butler in Gone with the Wind (1939), acting alongside Vivien Leigh and Olivia de Havilland. The film was massively successful, winning the Academy Award for Best Picture, and remains the highest-grossing film of all time, adjusted for inflation. The following year, he starred with leading lady Hedy Lamarr in the King Vidor-directed Comrade X. Also released that year, Strange Cargo would be Gable's last film with Crawford. His final film before joining the United States Army Air Forces was Somewhere I'll Find You (1942). During the war, he narrated the propaganda film Wings Up (1942) and filmed Combat America (1945).

Gable's first film after returning from combat was the Victor Fleming-directed Adventure (1945). His next role was alongside leading ladies Ava Gardner and Deborah Kerr in The Hucksters (1947). Gable next collaborated with Gardner and Grace Kelly in the John Ford-directed Mogambo (1953), a remake of Gable's earlier film Red Dust (1932). In 1958, Gable appeared in Run Silent, Run Deep, which also featured Burt Lancaster and Don Rickles. That same year, he starred opposite Doris Day and Mamie Van Doren in Teacher's Pet, which garnered him a nomination for Golden Globe Award for Best Actor – Motion Picture Musical or Comedy. Gable acted alongside Sophia Loren in It Started in Naples (1960). Gable's final film appearance was in the John Huston-directed western The Misfits (1961), released post-humously. It was also Marilyn Monroe's last acting role.

Film

World War II propaganda films

Short films

References

External links 
 
 
 Clark Gable at the Rotten Tomatoes

Gable, Clark
Gable, Clark